Mobility Resort Motegi (モビリティリゾートもてぎ) is a motorsport race track located at Motegi, Tochigi Prefecture, Japan. Originally named Twin Ring Motegi (ツインリンクもてぎ), the circuit's name came from the facility having two race tracks: a  oval and a  road course. It was built in 1997 by Honda Motor Co., Ltd., as part of the company's effort to bring the IndyCar Series to Japan, helping to increase their knowledge of American open-wheel racing. The oval was last raced on in 2010, and on 1 March 2022, the name of the track was changed to Mobility Resort Motegi, coinciding with the 25th anniversary of the facility. The road course's most notable event is the Japanese motorcycle Grand Prix.

Super speedway 
 The oval course is the only one of its kind in Japan used for competitive racing. It is a low-banked,  egg-shaped course, with turns three and four being much tighter than turns one and two. On March 28, 1998, CART held the inaugural Indy Japan 300 at Twin Ring Motegi Speedway. The race was won by Mexican driver Adrián Fernández. CART continued racing at Twin Ring Motegi Speedway from 1998–2002. In 2003, Honda entered the Indy Racing League and the race became a part of the IRL schedule. In addition to Indy car racing, the track has also hosted a single NASCAR exhibition race in 1998.

Honda, which had built the oval for the express purpose of developing its oval-racing program for Indy car racing, did not win a race at the track for its first six years of operation. In 2004, Dan Wheldon took the first win for Honda on the oval. In 2008, the Motegi oval gained additional publicity when Danica Patrick became the first woman to win an Indycar race, beating Hélio Castroneves for her first and only Indycar victory.

The 2011 season was the last season of Indycar in Motegi. It had been dropped from the calendar as organizers looked to maximize viewing audiences. The road course, rather than the super speedway, was used for the 2011 race due to damage to the oval track resulting from the 2011 Tōhoku earthquake. The oval is not presently used for racing and even has been used as additional parking space during MotoGP events, but is still used for Honda's annual Thanks Day event showcasing various Honda road and racing vehicles, mainly from the nearby Honda Collection Hall, with Takuma Sato running a lap of the course in his 2017 Indianapolis 500 winning car seven years since the last IndyCar race in the oval.

Track length of paved oval 
The track length is disputed by series that run at Twin Ring Motegi. This length was used by CART in their races between 1998 and 2002, too. This length was also used in the following races till 2010.

NASCAR history

Mike Skinner won the only NASCAR Cup Series exhibition race held at the track in 1998, the Coca-Cola 500. Skinner won driving the No.31 Chevrolet for Richard Childress Racing. The race was most noted for being the first oval track NASCAR race in Japan as well as being the first in which Dale Earnhardt and his son, Dale Earnhardt Jr., competed with one another, driving No.3 and No.1 Coca-Cola Chevrolets, respectively. The track also held the NASCAR K&N Pro Series West in 1999 with Kevin Richards getting the win.

Road course 
Although they are separate tracks, it is impossible for races to occur simultaneously on the two courses; to access the oval track, teams must cross the road course pit and front straight. The road course also runs in the opposite direction from the oval; clockwise, rather than counter-clockwise.

The course itself is built in a stop-start straight-hairpin style, which flows differently than many similarly-sized tracks. By Japanese standards the circuit is exceptionally flat, with only a slight elevation rise towards the hairpin turn. The road course is much busier than the oval track, with Super Formula visiting twice, Super GT and Super Taikyu cars once each, and local events almost every weekend. The road course can be used in three ways: the full course, or two "short courses" can be made, using connecting roadways. These short courses are usually used for junior formula events, such as Formula 4 and FJ1600.

The road course is also a popular motorcycle racing track, with the MotoGP usually visiting once a year, as well as several Japanese national bike racing series. It has hosted the Pacific motorcycle Grand Prix from 2000 to 2003 and the Japanese motorcycle Grand Prix since 2004.

Other facilities
In addition to the main racing complex, Mobility Resort Motegi features a second road course (called the "North Short Course") for karting and Formula 4 events, as well as a  dirt track for modified and sprint car racing and also standard saloon racing. In addition, the FIM Trials series visits the track every year for the world trials championship. Therefore, an outdoor trials course exists on the facility.

Outside of racing, Mobility Resort Motegi has the Honda Collection Hall, which features historic Honda racing and production cars and motorcycles, and Honda Fan Fun Lab, which features Honda's next generation technologies such as robotics, fuel-cell vehicles and aviation. Honda also operates a technology demonstration center on the site, as well as educational centers.

In 2009, a cafe opened which was named after the Gran Turismo video games.

Track difficulties 
Mobility Resort Motegi is a separate-but-combined road-and-oval track (as opposed to the "roval" tracks common in the United States), and the decision to include a full road course contained largely within the oval necessitated design compromises. For spectators, sightlines can be extremely poor for road course races, as the grandstands are much further back than usual. The oval course blocks the view of much of the road course, including the best passing point on the track , and several large-screen televisions are needed. Seating outside the grandstand is limited to areas of the infield and along the  backstraight of the road course.

Track access is a major concern, with only two entry and exit points by a two-lane public road. Motegi is not a particularly large town, and accommodation is virtually non-existent close to the track, except for the on-site hotel. Train links to the area are extremely limited (the major regional lines, JR East and Tobu Railway do not service the area), nor has a planned superhighway been completed. Thus the stated track capacity (about 65,000) is dictated largely by traffic flow, not by actual seating capacity (estimated to be nearly 100,000 for road-course events, 80,000 for the oval).

In 2011, Casey Stoner and Jorge Lorenzo proposed to boycott the MotoGP race out of fears for their health from radiation from the Fukushima Daiichi Nuclear Power Plant even though all the independent scientific experts including the World Health Organization and Australian Radiation Protection and Nuclear Safety Agency had stated that it is safe to live permanently  or more from the plant. In the end, all the teams showed up for the race.

Layout configurations

Lap records

The official fastest race lap records at the Mobility Resort Motegi are listed as:

Events

 Current

 April: MFJ Superbikes
 July: GT World Challenge Asia Fanatec Japan Cup, Formula Regional Japanese Championship, GT4 Asia Series
 August: Super Formula Championship, TCR Japan Touring Car Series, MFJ Superbikes
 September: Super Taikyu
 October: Grand Prix motorcycle racing Japanese motorcycle Grand Prix, Asia Talent Cup
 November: Super GT, Super Formula Lights, F4 Japanese Championship

 Former

 Champ Car Bridgestone Potenza 500 (1998–2002)
 Coca-Cola 500 (1998)
 Grand Prix motorcycle racing Pacific motorcycle Grand Prix (2000–2003)
 IndyCar Series Indy Japan 300 (2003–2011)
 Japan Le Mans Challenge (2006–2007)
 World Touring Car Championship FIA WTCC Race of Japan (2015–2017)

In popular media
As a large recently constructed Japanese circuit, Mobility Resort Motegi has and continues to be utilised virtually in a large number of electronic video games, both in arcade machines and in PC and console games for home use.
 In Honda's 2005 Clio Awards winning commercial "Impossible Dream", the sequence in which the BAR Formula One car is driven into the bridge was filmed at the circuit.
During the opening sequence of Kamen Rider Agito, the three main Kamen Riders are shown riding around the circuit, as Honda is the series sponsor.
During the ending sequence of Engine Sentai Go-onger, the series' characters are shown dancing on the main straight of the road course. The racetrack is revealed in the series as the primary Go-onger team's origin (it is known that Saki Rouyama, Go-on Yellow, works there), and was used (along with the Honda Collection Hall) in the final scene from "Road Of Justice", the final episode of the series.
In Super Hero Taisen GP: Kamen Rider 3, a race called the Rider Grand Prix will take place in a variation of the Twin Ring Motegi, owned by Shocker in the altered timeline.
 The track is available in racing games such as Forza Motorsport 2, Forza Motorsport 3, Forza Motorsport 4, Gran Turismo 4, Gran Turismo for PSP, Gran Turismo 5, Gran Turismo 6, iRacing.com and RaceRoom Racing Experience.
During the first tankery battle in Girls und Panzer Das Finale Part 1, Ooarai Girls Academy against BC Freedom High School, members of Leopon Team, the VK 4501 (P) reference the track, saying they wished they re-opened the oval layout.

See also
 Suzuka Circuit, a Honda owned track built in 1962 and host to the FIA Formula One Japanese Grand Prix.
 Fuji Speedway, a road track originally conceived as a high speed oval, and former host to the Japanese Grand Prix.

Access
Bus routes
JR Bus Kanto
For Utsunomiya Station via Motegi Station
Ibaraki Kotsu
For Mito Station (Ibaraki)

References

External links

Mobility Resort Motegi - in Japanese
Mobility Resort Motegi - in English
Map and circuit history at RacingCircuits.info
Street View imagery in Google Maps
Satellite picture by Google Maps

Honda
Champ Car circuits
Motorsport venues in Japan
Grand Prix motorcycle circuits
NASCAR tracks
IndyCar Series tracks
Sports venues in Tochigi Prefecture
World Touring Car Championship circuits
1997 establishments in Japan
Sports venues completed in 1997
Motegi, Tochigi